Malcolm Brown (born 4 April 1935) is a former motorcycle speedway rider who rode for Hackney Hawks and Leicester Lions in the 1960s and 1970s.

Biography
Born in Walthamstow, Brown began speedway racing at Rye House, signing for the Hackney Hawks in 1964, and was an ever-present for Hackney in the 1966, 1967, and 1968 seasons. In that era he also sang regularly in Working Men's Clubs in East London. He moved to the Leicester Lions in 1969, and was a mainstay of the team between 1969 and 1974. He retired from racing after the 1974 season, although he did return to Leicester for a second half event in 1977. 

Brown moved to Rhodesia in the mid-1970s, where he promoted speedway at Bulawayo. He also ran his own Z International nightclub, where he performed as a singer and comedian. The end of colonial rule, as Rhodesia became Zimbabwe, saw Brown return to the UK, where he opened the Raffles club in St Austell. In 1988 he relocated again, this time to Florida, where he set up a cleaning company. Through his neighbour, Burt Reynolds, Brown got a small part in the TV series B.L. Stryker, and went on to appear in films such as Illtown and Do You Wanna Know a Secret?.  In 2005, he recorded an album, On Track, with proceeds going to help fund the National Speedway Museum.

Career record
All figures relate to the British League.

References

External links
 Malcolm Brown

1935 births
Living people
British speedway riders
English motorcycle racers
Leicester Lions riders
Hackney Hawks riders